Elachista lamina is a moth of the family Elachistidae. It is found in Washington and British Columbia.

References

Moths described in 1948
Endemic fauna of the United States
Moths of North America
lamina